CASisDEAD, also known as CAS and formerly Castro, is a UK rap/grime MC, producer, visual director and entrepreneur from Tottenham, London. He is of Ghanaian and English descent.

He is the owner of the label IM REALLYDEAD, through which he releases his own music. He began rapping in 2005 under the name Castro Saint, a moniker he kept until 2007. In his first spell in music, Castro made no music videos.  He resumed a music career in 2012 under the name CASisDEAD. Since returning to music in 2012 he has worn a mask during all public appearances and videos; this has led to speculation over his true identity and intentions in protecting it.

Music career

2005–12: Early years
CASisDEAD began rapping under the name of Castro Saint in 2005. During this period he produced, penned, and recorded tracks such as "Adolescence", "C from T", and "Drugs", which he based on his experiences of growing up in the streets of Tottenham and selling drugs.

Castro stopped rapping in 2007 to pursue business ventures and run his pharmaceuticals business. During this period he also recorded some songs with East London-based grime crew In Da Hood. A bootleg collection of tracks recorded during this period was distributed on the internet enabling Castro's music output to remain accessible.

In 2012, CASisDEAD returned to music using the name CAS before switching to CASisDEAD approximately 18 months later. CASisDEAD returned with his crew the 'DEAD TEAM'.

2013: The Number 23 mixtape
In December 2013, CASisDEAD released The Number 23 mixtape which contains the majority of singles he released in 2012 & 2013.

The first music release of his comeback was the rap "T.R.O.N." this was shortly followed by "Leon Best". CASisDEAD continued to release singles with accompanying self-directed videos throughout 2012 and into 2013.

He later released these tracks and various remixes as part of the mixtape The Number 23, the mixtape was also thought to contain some material previously intended for the unreleased "Commercial" album.

His lyrical versatility is witnessed in the songs that comprise his "23" mixtape where he raps across musical styles such as: grime, drum & bass, electro, jazz, soul, and the Bullitt film soundtrack. For the singles included within the "23" mixtape, CAS has worked with several producers such as: Faze Miyake (Play); Merky Ace; Nutty P; MssingNo (Drugs Don't Work); Skywlkr (All Hallows’); and JME (Baraka & Cheese Slice remix).

2015–16: Commercial 2 EP and singles
In September 2015, CAS issued a limited release of the "Commercial 2" EP, which was sold in cassette tape format via his website. The Commercial 2 EP comprises 6 tracks: 1. Intro, 2. Colours, 3. Tick Tock, 4. Phonecall, 5. Dumb, 6. Outro

The synthpop production on Commercial 2 has been heavily influenced by the 1980s musical output of artists Gary Numan and Steve Strange. In Commercial 2, CAS raps emotionally bleak lyrics about his struggles with his narcotic-centred lifestyle. CAS' dark lyrics are juxtaposed against the light catchy electronic production; this juxtaposition reflects the reality of dealing with the dark and light aspects of his everyday life.

CASisDEAD stated that he chose to release the EP in limited quantities and on cassette, as he felt that this suited the material and would make listeners appreciate it more, as they would have to work harder to get a copy. As a treat for his fans, he streamed the Commercial 2 EP via "Twitch T.V." on November the 13th at 10 pm. There are no plans at present to release a digital version of the mixtape. However, as a measure to stop touts from exploiting his fans CAS provided a further limited release of the Commercial 2 cassettes on 23 December at 12pm via his website.

CASisDEAD released the single "Simon" in January 2016 with an accompanying video. The video is directed by CAS and styled as an episode of the current affairs programme Panorama. The track is produced by Skywlkr. The rapper's lyrics are delivered through the perspective of a long time drug user Simon who has lost everything due to his addictions and now "drifts between homelessness, prison and the hospital". The character of Simon the drug addict has appeared in CASisDEAD's earlier songs. Simon is first mentioned in Castro's 2005 rap "Drugs" & he then features in CAS's 2012 rap "Drugs Don't Work".

In May 2016, CASisDEAD released the upbeat single "Before This" with a highly stylised video directed by the rapper set around the domestic theme of grocery shopping & cooking. In the video, the couple's shared domesticity contrasts with the lyrics of the song which focus on a light-hearted dalliance.

The track is a collaboration between CAS & Later - a duo comprising London producer Drive Me Home (Dominik Binegger) and Norwegian singer/songwriter Linn Carin Dirdal. The track is laced with an electronic beat reminiscent of 1980s synthpop (a musical style heavily influencing the Commercial 2 EP).

CASisDEAD features on two tracks on Giggs album "Landlord" released on 5 August 2016. CAS raps on "501 Hollow & Heston" and also on "Lyrical Combat". The two rappers first collaborated in November 2015 when Giggs featured on a remix of CASisDEAD's "What's my Name?" Giggs released "501" as the second single from his album with a video directed by CASisDEAD featuring the rappers in a car mechanic workshop.

CAS features on Tricky's EP "Obia" released on 30 September 2016: he contributes his lyrics to a reworked version of "Does It" (the single is originally from Tricky's "False Idols" album). Tricky released "Does It" via the Noisey website on 21 September, a week before the release of the Obia EP.

Style and artistry
Since his return in 2012, CASisDEAD has worn a skull mask in all public appearances. The rapper is typically seen in a Dead Team 'Face' hoodie, red beanie, and red vans in his music videos, merchandise, promotional materials, and during his performances.

In 2016 he adopted two additional silicone face masks to his stage persona. He is first seen wearing the second mask in his fleeting appearance in the "Simon" music video. His third mask is a Freddy Krueger inspired silicone face & neck prothesis complete with silicone hands. He wears this mask in the "501" music video.

The rapper has described his persona as a symbol of his personal struggles and his disillusionment with the social and political mainstream.

The DEAD TEAM is the support network behind CASisDEAD. The principle members of the team are: creative director & in-house producer Cyrus (1MediaGroup); Mason (MasonisDead); Rico (KingRico); video director ICOproductions;  DJ Kyzer (SpecialKyz); creative director AfreeCanRAGE; BadgerB2; and music producer WVLEWNTRS. The team are an integral part of his live shows and always accompany him on stage.

A key member of the DEAD TEAM, Renea Campbell-Russell (Mello), died aged 26, in June 2015. In an interview with Loud & Quiet magazine, CAS stated that the pain of Mello's death motivates him & the DEAD TEAM to pursue their artistic vision. In honour of Mello's life and legacy CAS and the DEAD TEAM use the hashtag #FOREVERMELLO

CASisDEAD has directed several of his music videos. He has stated in an interview that his songs usually originate from a scenario he first sees in his mind; he then selects a suitable beat and creates a rap to capture his initial vision./ He states that he perceives himself to be, in equal measure, both a visual artist/director and rapper. He is involved in the entire process of making his music videos. CAS starts by developing the video's storyboard; he then proceeds to arrange the practical details of the music video's mise-en-scène - this includes setting the lighting, props, and set design. CAS then directs the music video and he also oversees the final edit.

He has directed the music videos for: Cheese Slice; All Hallows; Charlotte; What's My Name?; Simon; Before This; 501 Hollow & Heston; THE XXIII - WEEKEND; The Grid.

Critical reception 
Critical reception for CASisDEAD's work has been positive and Loud and Quiet complimented his Commercial 2''' EP for being fresh.

WordPlay Magazine praised The Number 23 mixtape, stating that they felt that it was "in the top 3 UK releases" for 2013. The magazine also applauded "23" for being "exceptionally intelligent, great delivery and a mastery of story telling."

In May 2015, the English producer The Purist stated in the Passion of the Weiss magazine, "I genuinely rate Cas as the best rapper to ever come out of England. Ever. I rate him that highly. I literally can't speak any higher of his talent. To me, he's a combination of Nas, Big L, Mobb Deep, and Dizzee Rascal."

In December 2015 Mixmag compared the artist favorably to Mike Skinner, Giggs and Chuckie and stated that he was "quite possibly one of the best things to ever happen in British rap music". And, in a 2016 radio interview, Dizzee Rascal paid tribute to Cas for being the best lyricist and pristine.

In an interview with Global Rockstar Magazine in March 2016, Tricky lauded CASisDEAD for his originality stating, "See what Cas does, even if it sold a million records you'd still have to call it underground. Because it's different. And he's not playing by any rules".

Personal life
CASisDEAD is a supporter of Newcastle United F.C.

Selected discography
Mixtapes
 Best of Castro Saint 
 The Number 23 (2013)

Extended plays
 Commercial 2'' (2015)

Singles as lead artist

Guest appearances

References

External links
 CASisDEAD Twitter
 CASisDEAD Music Videos
 CASisDEAD & CASTRO Lyrics

Rappers from London
Artists from London
People from Tottenham
Living people
1986 births
XL Recordings artists